Colonial Office is the government agency which serves to oversee and supervise their colony
 Colonial Office - The British Government department
 Office of Insular Affairs - the American government agency
 Reichskolonialamt - the German Colonial Office